The Panathinaikos Movement is a Greek political party, founded in 2012.
The Panathinaikos Movement is the first political and social political party in the history of the country, founded by people with an initial common their love for the sports club of Panathinaikos and the wish for a new stadium for the football team, despite the bureaucracy of the Greek state.

The party participated in the parliamentary elections of May 6 and received 31 votes, although they did not have ballots. Anyone who wanted to vote the party wrote PANATHINAIKOS MOVEMENT over a blank ballot and a legal representative put a seal to be considered as valid.
In the parliamentary elections of June 2012 Panathinaikos Movement rapidly increased rates, rising from the 31 votes they had on previous elections to 12,439 votes (0.20%).
At local elections on 18 May 2014 Panathinaikos Movement got 2.91% of the vote in the municipality of Athens (6.489 votes), winning a seat at the City Council.

Elections May 6, 2012
Votes of Panathinaikos Movement
Eclect. Region Votes: 
Athens A 4 
Athens B 21 
Athens Prefecture 6 
Total votes: 31

Elections June 17, 2012
Votes of "Panathinaikos' Movement'
Achaea 588
Athens A 620
Athens B 1,960
Athens Prefecture 683
Aetolia-Acarnania 467
Arcadia 165
Arta 180
Chania 263
Chios 115
Corinthia 288
Cyclades 339
Drama 146
Dodecanese 367
Evros 459
Euboea 441
Elis 365
Florina 123
Heraklion 435
Ioannina 259
Karditsa 246
Kavala 243
Kozani 248
Lasithi 199
Lesbos 200
Magnesia 293
Messenia 297
Phocis 100
Piraeus A 196
Piraeus B  305
Preveza 128
Rethymno 119
Rhodope 189
Serres 235
Thessaloniki A 191
Thessaloniki B 142
Trikala 371
Xanthi 261
Total votes: 12,459 Percentage: 0.20%

External links
 

Political parties established in 2012
2012 establishments in Greece